Brian Morgan may refer to:

Brian Morgan (snooker player) (born 1968), English snooker player and coach
Brian Morgan (lawyer) (1950–2007), Canadian lawyer
Brian Alexander Morgan, record producer

See also 
Bryan Morgan (disambiguation)